Vocabulario manual de las lenguas castellana y mexicana is a Spanish-Nahuatl dictionary by Pedro de Arenas, first published some time before 1611 (the year of the second edition). It was one of the most popular Nahuatl dictionaries, going through at least eleven editions in 220 years.

References

External links
1793 edition, via Google Books

1611 books
Nahuatl dictionaries and grammars
Classical Nahuatl